ECJS may refer to:
Education civique, juridique et sociale, Citizen education in France
East coast joint stock, British railway entity